Carex hartmanii is a species of flowering plant belonging to the family Cyperaceae.

Its native range is Europe to Central Asia.

References

hartmaniorum